Mikkeli University of Applied Sciences (MAMK) was a university of applied sciences in the region of Southern Savonia in Finland, located in Mikkeli and Savonlinna. It was established in 1992, and ceased to operate at the end of 2016 when it merged with Kymenlaakso University of Applied Sciences to form South-Eastern Finland University of Applied Sciences (XAMK).

References

External links
www.xamk.fi

Universities and colleges in Finland
Educational institutions established in 1992
Mikkeli
Universities and colleges formed by merger in Finland
1992 establishments in Finland